The Dub Farris Athletic Complex is a sporting complex with the Dub Farris Stadium owned by the Northside ISD located in San Antonio, Texas.

The complex is known for its 10,568-seat football & soccer stadium but it is also home to a large natatorium.  In 2010, NISD announced a three-year agreement that allowed the UTSA Roadrunners football team to use the stadium for practice.

References

External links
 Info at NISD
 Satellite image from Google Maps
 Texas Bob - San Antonio Area Stadiums

High school football venues in Texas
Soccer venues in Texas
Sports venues in San Antonio
UTSA Roadrunners football
2003 establishments in Texas
Sports venues completed in 2003